The 2016 Latvian First League (referred to as the komanda.lv Pirmā līga for sponsorship reasons) started on 2 April 2016 and ended on 11 November 2016.

League table

External links 
 The First League on the Latvian Football Federation website
  League321.com - Latvian football league tables, records & statistics database. 

Latvian First League seasons
2
Latvia
Latvia